Penn Lyon Homes is a construction firm specializing in modular home design, systems-built homes, and commercial modular buildings with its products being distributed through independent builders, developers, and dealers.  The company was founded in 1981, and today operates out of Selinsgrove, Pennsylvania.  Penn Lyon has twice been named to the list of 500 fastest-growing privately held companies [1987, 1988] by INC Magazine.

Penn Lyon closed in September 2010.

In January 2011, custom modular home manufacturer Haven Custom Homes of Linthicum, Maryland began leasing the facility to begin building their new "Classic Homes by Haven" line. At that time, negotiations were proceeding for acquisition of the facility.

External links
 Penn Lyon Web site
 Haven Custom Homes Web site

References

Construction and civil engineering companies of the United States
Home builders
Manufactured home manufacturers
Manufacturing companies based in Pennsylvania
American companies established in 1981
Construction and civil engineering companies established in 1981
Manufacturing companies established in 1981
Manufacturing companies disestablished in 2010
1981 establishments in Pennsylvania
2010 disestablishments in Pennsylvania